Hovey is a surname. Notable people with the surname include:

 Alvin Peterson Hovey (1821–1891), American Civil War Union general, governor of Indiana and Indiana Supreme Court justice
 Charles Edward Hovey (1827–1897), educator, college president and general in the U.S. Army
 Charles Fox Hovey (1807–1859), businessman in Boston, Massachusetts
 Charles Mason Hovey (1810–1887), American nurseryman, seed merchant, journalist and author
 Charles Hovey (naval officer) (1885–1911), U.S. Navy officer
 Chester Ralph Hovey (1872–1953), Associate Justice of the Washington Supreme Court
 Elliot Hovey (born 1983), American Olympic rower
 Frederick Hovey (1868–1945), American tennis player
 George Rice Hovey (1860–1943), American university president, minister, professor and author
 Natasha Hovey (born 1967), Italian actress 
 Richard Hovey (1864–1900), American poet, songwriter and playwright
 Serge Hovey (1920–1989), American composer and ethnomusicologist

See also
 Justice Hovey (disambiguation)